Ancylosis cinnamomeifascia is a species of snout moth in the genus Ancylosis. It was described by Rothschild in 1915, and is known from Algeria.

References

Moths described in 1915
cinnamomeifascia
Endemic fauna of Algeria
Moths of Africa